Mochov is a municipality and village in Prague-East District in the Central Bohemian Region of the Czech Republic. It has about 1,300 inhabitants.

Geography
It lies in a flat agricultural landscape in the Central Elbe Table. The Výmola Brook flows through the municipality.

History

The first written mention of Mochov is from 1360. From 1437 to 1611, the village belonged to the Přerov estate. Then Emperor Rudolf II sold Mochov to Magdalena Trčka of Lípa, who joined it to the Kounice estate. It remained part of this estate until the establishment of an independent municipality in 1850.

Transport
The D11 motorway (part of the European route E67) from Prague to Hradec Králové passes through the municipality.

Sights
The landmark of Mochov is the Church of Saint Bartholomew. It is originally a late Gothic church from the 13th century, which was later baroque rebuilt.

References

External links

Villages in Prague-East District